Manny Stul (born 1948/49) is an Australian billionaire, and the CEO of Moose Toys, a company he took over in 2000, with sales subsequently increased by over 7,000%.

Background and career 
Manny Stul was born in a refugee camp near Munich, Germany to Polish-Jewish parents who were both Holocaust survivors, and had fled Poland in 1949 due to Communist rule.

At the age of fifteen Stul won a scholarship to an advanced school, although he later had the funding pulled. He subsequently dropped out of school.

Moose Toys is best known for its Shopkins and Mighty Beanz collectible plastic toys, which take inspiration from everyday grocery and department store items. In 2016, Stul became the first Australian to win the Ernst & Young World Entrepreneur Of The Year, at the age of 67, having already won EY's Australian Entrepreneur of the Year.

Personal life
Stul lives in Melbourne with his wife Jacqui Tobias; and has a step-son, Paul Solomon, who is his co-CEO.

Wealth rankings

References

1940s births
Living people
Australian chief executives
People from Melbourne
Australian people of Polish-Jewish descent
Australian billionaires